This is a complete list of ice hockey players who were drafted in the National Hockey League Entry Draft by the Minnesota North Stars franchise. It includes every player the franchise drafted prior to their move to Dallas, from 1967 to 1992, regardless of whether they played for the team.

Key
 Played at least one game with the North Stars
 Spent entire NHL career with the North Stars
() Inducted into the Hockey Hall of Fame

Draft picks

See also
List of Minnesota North Stars players
1967 NHL Expansion Draft
1991 NHL Dispersal and Expansion Drafts
List of Dallas Stars draft picks

References

 
 
 

 
draft picks
Minnesota North Stars